Czermno  is a village in the administrative district of Gmina Gąbin, within Płock County, Masovian Voivodeship, in east-central Poland.

The village has a population of 477.

History
Czermno was a royal village of the Polish Crown, administravely located in the Rawa Voivodeship in the Greater Poland Province of the Polish Crown.

During the German occupation (World War II), farmers from Czermno were among six Polish farmers murdered by the Germans in November 1939 in the forest near Gąbin (see Nazi crimes against the Polish nation).

References

Czermno
Rawa Voivodeship